Pandanus joskei is a species of plant in the family Pandanaceae. It is endemic to Fiji.

References

Endemic flora of Fiji
joskei
Vulnerable plants
Taxonomy articles created by Polbot
Taxa named by John Horne (botanist)
Taxa named by Isaac Bayley Balfour